Pyaar Ke Do Naam: Ek Raadha, Ek Shyaam is an Indian television romantic drama series, which premiered on 3 April 2006. It was broadcast on Star Plus on Monday through Thursday. The series was produced by Rajshri Productions and starred Barkha Bisht and Indraneil Sengupta.

The story focuses on the concept of reincarnation and how everlasting love lasts between Raadha and Shyaam.

Plot
The story follows the reincarnating lives of a couple through three different generations. It opens with young students Radha, a simple girl aspiring to be a doctor, and Shyam, a playboy in the school. Initially, they dislike each other, but gradually begin to spend more time together and destiny makes them fall in love.

When Shyam visits a remote village Lakhanpur, it reminds him of his past life as Kishan, whereas Radha was Shyama. Due to a conflict in their village created by goons, Shyama jumps off a cliff and dies. When Kishan learns of this, he also commits suicide.

Back in the present, Radha and Shyam unite, but find out their families hate each other. A community conflict orders them to be killed.

The two are reborn again in the future as Radhika and Krishna, and again strive to be united in love as one.

Cast

Main
 Barkha Sengupta as Raadha Sharma / Shyaama / Radhika
 Indraneil Sengupta as Shyaam Sahaay / Kishan / Krishna (Krish)

Recurring
 Muskaan Mihani as Maala
 Ramesh Deo as Dada Thakur
 Sonali Khare as Kaveri Sharma: Raadha's sister
 Rakesh Pandey as Brijkishore Sharma: Raadha's father
 Satyajit Sharma as Mr. Sahaay: Shyaam's father
 Sadhana Singh as Mamta Sahaay: Shyaam's mother
 Tabassum as Kishan's Grandmother
 Shweta Gulati as Tanya
 Karishma Tanna as Jitisha Agarwal
 Amrapali Gupta as Ginno
 Sangram Singh as Rohit
 Rucha Gujarathi as Mahalaxmi
 Tarun Khanna as Ajay Singh Rathore
 Mukesh Khanna as Gajendra Singh Rathore
 Shiv Subramaniam as Vikrant Raj Rana
 Sandeep Bhansali as Thakur
 Sooraj Thapar as Mr. Agarwal
 Sachin Sharma as Rohit Verma
 Bhumika Sharma as small kid
 Lakshya Sharma as small kid

References

External links
Hindi Ringtone Download Free
Pyaar Ke Do Naam: Ek Raadha, Ek Shyaam Official Site on IMDb.com
News Article on Pyaar Ke...

StarPlus original programming
Indian drama television series
2006 Indian television series debuts
2006 Indian television series endings